Amar Neupane is a Nepalese writer and novelist. He is best known for his Madan Puraskar winning novel, Seto Dharti. He started his writing journey with Paniko Gham, a novel set in Nepalgunj.

Early life 
He was born on March 27, 1974 (Chaitra 14, 2034) as a second to father Eknath Neupane and mother Hari Maya Neupane in Rangeela, Chitwan, Nepal.

Literary career 
His first novel Paniko Gham was published in 2066 BS and won the Padmashree Sahitya Puraskar award. His collection of children's stories Kalilo Man (Young Heart) won the Parijat Balsahitya Pandulipi Purashkar award. His novel Seto Dharti won the Madan Puraskar—the greatest award in Nepalese literature—and also the Ramraj Panta Smriti Purashkar award. His novel Karodaun Kasturi is based on the story of what Nepali comedian Hari Bansha Acharya would have become if he hadn't recognized his talent as a comedian.

Bibliography

See also 

 Buddhi Sagar
 Neelam Karki Niharika
 Nayan Raj Pandey

References

Nepali-language writers
Living people
Place of birth missing (living people)
Madan Puraskar winners
Nepalese writers
People from Chitwan District
Padmashree Sahitya Puraskar winners
1974 births
21st-century Nepalese writers
Khas people
21st-century Nepalese male writers